Luddy is the surname of:

 Barbara Luddy (1908-1979), American film and radio actress
 Edward I. Luddy, a stage name of Edward Ludwig (1899-1982), Russian-born American film director and writer
 Fred Luddy (born 1954/1955), American billionaire founder of ServiceNow
 Robert Luddy, founder of CaptiveAire Systems, an American manufacturer of commercial kitchen ventilation systems
 Tom Luddy (born 1943), American film producer and co-founder of the Telluride Film Festival